The Carnegie Library in North Tonawanda, New York is a historic Carnegie library building designed and built in 1903 with funds provided by the philanthropist Andrew Carnegie. It is in Niagara County, New York and one of 3,000 Carnegie libraries constructed between 1885 and 1919, including 107 in New York State. 

Carnegie provided $20,000 toward the construction of the North Tonawanda library.  It is a low one-story brick structure with basement in the Classical Revival style.  The interior features wood paneling, elaborate plaster moldings and trim, mosaic tile floors, and a large stained glass skylight.

The building functioned as a library until 1976, when it became home to the Carnegie Art Center of the Tonawandas' Council on the Arts.

It was listed on the National Register of Historic Places in 1995.

See also
List of Carnegie libraries in New York

References

External links
Carnegie Library - U.S. National Register of Historic Places on Waymarking.com
Carnegie Art Center website

Library buildings completed in 1903
Buildings and structures in Niagara County, New York
Libraries on the National Register of Historic Places in New York (state)
Neoclassical architecture in New York (state)
Carnegie libraries in New York (state)
Former library buildings in the United States
Arts centers in New York (state)
Tourist attractions in Niagara County, New York
North Tonawanda, New York
National Register of Historic Places in Niagara County, New York
1903 establishments in New York (state)